Carolyn Crudgington (born 18 August 1968 in Brisbane, Australia) was a softball player from Australia, who won a bronze medal at the 1996 Summer Olympics.

References

External links
Olympic Info

1968 births
Living people
Australian softball players
Olympic softball players of Australia
Softball players at the 1996 Summer Olympics
Olympic bronze medalists for Australia
Sportswomen from Queensland
Olympic medalists in softball
Sportspeople from Brisbane
Medalists at the 1996 Summer Olympics